Ukerewe District is one of the seven districts of the Mwanza Region of Tanzania. It is located on Ukerewe Island, Ukara Island and other neighbouring islands within Lake Victoria. The largest settlement and the district's administrative capital is Nansio.

In 2016 the Tanzania National Bureau of Statistics report there were 388,778 people in the district, from 345,147 in 2012.

There are several small hotels and guest houses on the island to accommodate visitors.

The district can be accessed by boats operating between Mwanza city and Nansio town in the Island daily. A road connecting the Island with Bunda district in Mara region across the lake Victoria by ferries on the eastern part, can be an ideal route for those wishing not to spend much time in waterways.

Administrative subdivisions

Constituencies
For parliamentary elections, Tanzania is divided into constituencies. As of the 2020 elections Ukerewe District had one constituency:
 Ukerewe Constituency

Divisions
Ukerewe District is administratively divided into divisions.

Wards
Ukerewe District is administratively divided into twenty-five wards:

 Bukanda
 Bukiko
 Bukindo
 Bukongo
 Bukungu
 Bwiro
 Bwisya
 Igalla
 Ilangala
 Irugwa
 Kagera
 Kagunguli
 Kakerege
 Kakuru
 Mukituntu
 Muriti
 Murutunguru
 Nakatunguru
 Namagondo
 Namilembe
 Nansio
 Nduruma
 Ngoma
 Nkilizya
 Nyamanga

References

External links
Map of Ukerewe Island

Districts of Mwanza Region
Lake Victoria

eo:Ukerevo